Adrian Freiherr von Fölkersam 20 December 1914 – 21 January 1945) was a German Brandenburger and Waffen-SS officer in World War II.

Career 
Fölkersam was born into an aristocratic Baltic German family with a long record of service to the Russian Empire. Fölkersam's family fled Russia after the Russian Revolution and settled in Latvia. From 1934 he attended university in Munich, Königsberg and Vienna studying economics, at this time he became a member of the National Socialist movement and the SA. Fölkersam joined the Brandenburgers in May 1940, forming a special unit comprising Volksdeutsche (ethnic Germans) of Russian origin. His unit was active extensively during Operation Barbarossa, and he even led an operation to capture the Maikop oilfields with his men dressed as an NKVD detachment.

In 1944 Fölkersam's unit transferred to the Waffen-SS and became the major part of SS-Jagdverband Ost. This unit was active on the Eastern Front and took part in the kidnapping of Miklós Horthy Jr. and the deposition of his father, the Hungarian regent Miklós Horthy in Operation Panzerfaust. During the Battle of the Bulge, Fölkersam participated in Operation Greif, and worked in close coordination with Otto Skorzeny. In January 1945, having posted to the Eastern Front, he fought against the advancing Red Army in central Poland. Adrian von Fölkersam was killed in action on 21 January 1945 near Inowrocław, Poland. At the time of his death, he was an SS-Hauptsturmführer (captain), and was in command of the SS-Jagdverband Ost.

Awards
 Iron Cross (1939) 2nd and 1st Class
 Infantry Assault Badge
 Knight's Cross of the Iron Cross on 14 September 1942 as Leutnant der Reserve and adjutant in the Stab of the I./Lehr-Regiment z.b.V. 800 "Brandenburg"

References

Citations

Bibliography

 Mortimer, Gavin. (2012). Daring Dozen, 12 Special Forces Legends of World War II. Osprey Publishing. .
 

1914 births
1945 deaths
Military personnel from Saint Petersburg
German World War II special forces
Recipients of the Knight's Cross of the Iron Cross
SS-Sturmbannführer
Baltic nobility
Sturmabteilung personnel
Waffen-SS personnel killed in action
Latvian emigrants to Germany